Jennifer Ziegler is an American writer.

She teaches at Vermont College of Fine Arts.

Works 

 How Not to Be Popular. Random House Children's Books, 2008. 
 Revenge of the Flower Girls, Scholastic Inc., 2014. 
 Worser, 2022.

References

External links 

 https://jenniferziegler.com/

American writers
Year of birth missing (living people)
Living people